Vallo (also as Vallø) may refer to:

People
Given name
Vallo Allingu, Estonian basketball player
Vallo Kirs, Estonian actor
Vallo Reimaa, Estonian politician

Surname
Ambra Vallo, Italian ballet dancer
James Vallo, American actor and film producer

Places
Italy
Vallo della Lucania, a municipality in the Province of Salerno, Campania
Vallo di Diano, a geographical region of the Province of Salerno, Campania
Vallo di Nera, a municipality in the Province of Perugia, Umbria
Vallo Torinese, a municipality in the Province of Turin, Piedmont
Mazara del Vallo, a municipality in the Province of Trapani, Sicily
Pago del Vallo di Lauro, a municipality in the Province of Avellino, Campania
San Lorenzo del Vallo, a municipality in the Province of Cosenza, Calabria

Denmark
Vallø, a former municipality of Region Sjælland

Norway
Vallø (Tønsberg), a village part of the municipality of Tønsberg, Vestfold county

See also
 Vallum (disambiguation)
 Valo (disambiguation)

Estonian masculine given names